Triplosarus novaezelandiae is a species of beetles in the family Carabidae, the only species in the genus Triplosarus. It is endemic to New Zealand.

References

Harpalinae
Monotypic Carabidae genera
Endemic fauna of New Zealand
Endemic insects of New Zealand